The 2015 Asian Baseball Championship was an international baseball competition that was held in Taichung, Taiwan from September 16–20, 2015. It was the 27th edition of the tournament.

South Korea won the title. Japan previously won five straight gold medals in the tournament since 2003.

Qualified Teams
 – Host and 2nd place of the 2012 Asian Baseball Championship
 – 4th place of the 2012 Asian Baseball Championship
 – 1st place of the 2012 Asian Baseball Championship
 – 1st place of the 2015 Asian Baseball Cup South West Division
 – 1st place of the 2015 Asian Baseball Cup South East Division
 – 2nd place of the 2015 Asian Baseball Cup South East Division*
 – 3rd place of the 2012 Asian Baseball Championship

Results

See also
 List of sporting events in Taiwan

Notes

References

Asian Baseball Championship
2015
2015 in Taiwanese sport
Sport in Taichung
Asian Baseball Championship